Faridan may refer to:
Faridan County, an administrative subdivision of Iran
Daran, Iran, its capital